The Ernst-Kirchweger-Haus (EKH) is a self-managed social centre in Vienna's 10th district, Favoriten. It was squatted in 1990 and legalised in 2008. The project is named after Ernst Kirchweger.

Occupation 
The building was squatted on 23 June 1990, and became a self-managed social centre, which hosted migrants and refugees, an infoshop, community activities, and political groups. The squatters, who described the EKH as an "international, multi-cultural, anti-fascist centre," named the building after Ernst Kirchweger. He was a former concentration camp inmate and member of the anti-fascist resistance, who was killed in 1965 by a right-wing protester during a demonstration against Taras Borodajkewycz, a former member of the National Socialist German Workers Party.

Negotiations 

In 2004, the owner of the house (the Communist Party of Austria) sold the EKH to a real estate company, and the residents were threatened with eviction since the new owner was a former right wing extremist. After a long struggle with many protests and actions, a company with close contacts to the municipality of Vienna bought the building in July 2005. The threat of eviction passed and in 2008, a rental contract was signed.

2020 disturbances 
In June 2020, a feminist demonstration protesting the treatment of women in Austria and Turkey, organised by a Kurdish women’s organisation based at EKH, was attacked by the Turkish far-right group the Grey Wolves. In response, anti-fascists organised a counter-demonstration the next day and this resulted in 200-300 neo-fascists attacking the EKH building, throwing stones, bottles and firebombs. The situation then created a diplomatic war of words between Austria and Turkey, with the Turkish ambassador being invited to the Foreign Ministry.

See also 
Arena
Autonomism

References

External links 
   Ernst-Kirchweger-Haus
   English-language EKH homepage

1990 establishments in Austria
Autonomism
Buildings and structures in Favoriten
Communist Party of Austria
Infoshops
Legalized squats
Music venues in Austria
Squats
20th-century architecture in Austria